Henry Hall (1661 – 8 December 1755) was a British lighthouse keeper who worked on the Eddystone Lighthouse, in the English county of Devon, some 9 statute miles (14 kilometres) southwest of Rame Head, Cornwall, UK.

Background
Born in 1661, Henry Hall is the oldest-known member of the Hall Family of lighthouse keepers that kept lights around the English and Welsh coasts from at least the mid-eighteenth century until 1913. The Hall family intermarried with two lighthouse keeping families: the Knotts and the Darling family. One of the better known members of Darling family was Grace Darling, who participated  in the rescue of survivors of the Forfarshire.

Eddystone Lighthouse fire
Hall is remembered for his actions following a fire at the Eddystone Lighthouse on 2 December 1755, when the wooden Rudyerd's Tower of 1706 burned down. At around 2 a.m., Hall was on duty alone when he discovered that a spark from the lamp had set the roof alight. He attempted to put the fire out by throwing buckets of water "four yards higher than his head". Hall was soon joined by the other two lighthouse keepers who also tried to extinguish the fire. Hall looked up to check his progress and was showered with falling molten lead from the lighthouse roof. The lead fell upon his body burning his head, face, neck and shoulders. As his mouth was open, molten lead fell down his throat. Hall later recalled that he felt the hot lead go down his throat and screamed, "My God, I'm on fire inside!" Hall continued to help his fellow lighthouse keepers but the three were unable to put the fire out. The men were forced to retreat down the tower and eventually made their way to a cave to avoid the falling red hot debris.

The lighthouse continued to burn into the morning and would continue to burn for the next five days. At around 10 a.m., the three men were spotted by a passing boat. Due to rough surf, the sailors were unable to dock near the cave. The sailors threw a rope to Hall and his companions who tied them around their waists and were pulled through the water to the boat. They were taken to East Stonehouse, Plymouth where Hall was treated by Dr. Henry Spry (a surgeon at Plymouth) who tended to the man's burns and other injuries. Hall spoke to Dr. Spry "with a hoarse voice, scarce to be heard, that melted lead had run down his throat into his body" and was experiencing severe internal pain. Dr. Spry found Hall's claim unbelievable as he felt no person could survive having swallowed molten lead let alone live for hours afterward and be towed through water. Dr. Spry also noted that Hall was not exhibiting any other symptoms and reasoned that the trauma of the accident and Hall's advanced age were causing him to make wild claims. Dr. Spry later noted in a report sent on 19 December 1755 to the Royal Society in London that Henry Hall was "aged 94 years, of good constitution, and extremely active for one of that age".

Death
In the days following the fire, Hall was able to eat, drink and swallow medicine. He continued to tell Dr. Spry of the lead in his stomach and also told a friend who visited him. Hall seemed to be on the mend but by the sixth day, Dr. Spry observed that Hall's condition was declining. By this time, Hall could no longer eat or drink and began to rapidly worsen. He died on Monday, 8 December 1755, aged 94, at his home in East Stonehouse, Plymouth after "being seized with cold sweats and spasms of the tendons, he soon expired".

 Dr. Spry conducted an autopsy on Hall noting that, "left side of his body, below the short ribs, in the breast, mouth and throat ... left side of the head and face, with the eye extremely burnt". The autopsy revealed that "the diaphragmatic upper mouth of the stomach greatly inflamed and ulcerated, and the tunica in the lower part of the stomach burnt; and from the great cavity of it took out a great piece of lead ... which weighed exactly seven ounces, five drachms and eighteen grains".
Dr. Spry gave the following written account of how Hall and his two colleagues had explained to him how the lead came to be in Hall's stomach: "It will perhaps be thought difficult to explain the manner, by which the lead entered the stomach: But the account, which the deceased gave me and others, was, that as he was endeavouring to extinguish the flames, which were at a considerable height over his head, the lead of the lanthorn being melted dropped down, before he was aware of it, with great force into his mouth then lifted up and open, and in such a quantity, as to cover not only his face, but all his clothes."

Dr. Spry's account was received with such scepticism by The Royal Society that he felt constrained to conduct experiments on dogs and chickens, pouring melted lead down the animals' throats, to prove that it was possible to survive, for at least a limited period, such an extreme accident.

Legacy
There is a small plaque dedicated to Henry Hall with a few details as to the nature of this death located in Plymouth city centre, set into the pavement between Plymouth Pavilions, Salumi Bar & Eatery and The Duke of Cornwall Hotel, Millbay Road.

The piece of lead found in Henry Hall's stomach is now kept in the National Museum of Scotland.

Notes

References
 The Royal Society, Philosophical Transactions; Vol. 49 (1755–1756) pp. 477–484

External links
 US Lighthouse Society, including Spry's discussion of the case, and a photograph of the lead lump
 Memorial plaque, in the shape of the lead lump

1661 births
1755 deaths
17th-century English people
18th-century English people
Accidental deaths in England
British lighthouse keepers
People from Plymouth, Devon